The Power of the Dark Crystal is a 2017 comic book limited series that is a sequel to 1982 film The Dark Crystal. This series has a sequel, Beneath the Dark Crystal.

Conception
For decades, a sequel for the 1982 film The Dark Crystal had been planned as a motion picture, but ended up being adapted into a comic instead.

The unproduced screenplay was by  David Odell, Annette Odell and Craig Pearce.

Plot

It is set years after the events of the 1982 film where the Dark Crystal was healed and peace was restored on Thra. The world is faced with needing to reignite a dying sun at the center of the planet. The story of Power of the Dark Crystal follows the adventures of a young Fireling named Thurma, together with Kensho, a Gelfling outcast, that steal a shard of the Crystal of Truth in an attempt to reignite the dying sun.

Reception
The comic received a mostly positive reception from critics.

References

2017 comics debuts
Boom! Studios titles
The Dark Crystal
Comics based on films